Park Hyeon-joo (born 17 October 1958), a South Korean billionaire business magnate and a representative investment strategist who is the founder of Mirae Asset Financial Group which consists of asset management, investment banking, stock brokerage, life insurance, venture capital, and other financial services.

Park was born in Gwangju Metropolitan City, South Jeolla Province of South Korea in 1958. He graduated from Gwangju Cheil High School in 1977, and received his bachelor's degree in business from Korea University in 1983.

Park founded Mirae Asset Global Investment and Mirae Asset Capital in 1997, Mirae Asset Securities (hereinafter referred to as Mirae Asset Daewoo) in 1999, and subsequently founded  Mirae Asset Venture Capital and so forth, and made Mirae Asset become Korea's leading independent financial conglomerate.

Park brought the concept of the mutual fund as well as real-estate fund, and private equity fund into Korea's financial market which has changed its market dramatically from conventional to innovation.

Park is a prominent philanthropist, pledging to donate all his dividend payouts of shares to Mirae Asset Park Hyeon Joo Foundation, founded in 2000 with his own wealth, since 2010. The foundation has been providing scholarships to underprivileged students and other outreach programs which have accumulated to around 270,000 students. (as of February 2019)

Park has been appointed as Global Investment Strategy Officer (GISO) of Mirae Asset Financial Group in order to focus on global business and stepped down as a chairman of Mirae Asset Daewoo as of May 23, 2018.

The successful story of Mirae Asset Financial Group, led by Park, has been introduced in “The Case Centre” which is the world's most well-known case study institute.

Early life 
Park was born in Gwangju Metropolitan city, Jeollanam Province of South Korea in 1958.

His father had passed away on the day when Park received the admission letter to Gwangju Cheil high school.

Park's mother always emphasized on integrity, trust, and sincerity which kept him straight whilst wandering after his father passed away.

Park has come to Seoul after getting admission from Korea University and lived by himself. 
Park began to get interested in the stock market after catching the saying that “there is no improvement of capitalism without the development of the capital market”.
He, then, started to invest in listed stocks with the allowance that his mother sent since his Sophomore year of the college, and he was credited for the well-known stock investing college student amid Myeong-dong, Seoul.

Park has become to believe that the long-term investment on the blue-chip stock would eventually bring about good results and come up with the concept of value investing from the early stock experiences.

Business career

Early business career 

In 1985, at the age of 27, Park established an investment advisory services company on his own.
He, then, entered to Tongyang Securities in 1986. 
In 1988, Park left for Hanshin Investment Advisory Services company, which has changed its name into Dongwon Securities in April 1996, and acquired by Korea Investment Holdings in June 2005. Park managed the portfolio and recorded the highest return out of all the portfolio during the year. He, however, had been relocated to one of the branches at the time where the KOSPI rallied record-high of 1,007.77 pt and continuously down-turning afterward leading to recession. Despite having gone through hardship, he soon became a director of the branch at the age of 33, the youngest director in the company, and demonstrated the highest result out of 1,000 branches.

He recognized how important it is to trust and support each of the colleague's capability when managing a team, an organization, and this teamwork has become one of Mirae Asset Financial Group's core value.
The vision of the branch has been “go forward in order to spin the pinwheel although there are no winds”, and this is how Park could have had overcome hardship at his first experience of being a head of a branch.
Park received numerous offers proposing a remarkable salary, however, he cannot but reject all the offers in order to achieve his long-cherished dream and goal.

Foundation of Mirae Asset Financial Group 

Hyeonjoo Park founded Mirae Asset Global Investments and Mirae Asset Capital in June 1997 right after leaving the previous company.  Within 6 months after the foundation, Mirae Asset suffered from 1997 financial crisis of South Korea, however, showed a tremendous investment performance by believing in South Korea's economy to rebound with contrary investment insights where Park is notable for his adherence to long-term and value investing.

In December 1998, Park launched the first retail mutual fund, “Park Hyeon Joo No.1” in South Korea and The Journal of Investment & Pension described that this fund was a great success.

Merge and acquisition of Mirae Asset Financial Group 

Park has grown Mirae Asset Financial Group into an independent financial conglomerate in South Korea by successfully acquiring a number of financial companies with his contrary investment philosophy and insights.

 2004.02 Acquired SK Investment Trust Company, an affiliates of SK Group
 2005.06 Acquired SK Life Insurance, an affiliates of SK Group
 2011.11 Acquired Horizon ETF, a major ETF player in Canada
 2011.11 Acquired BetaShares, a major ETF player in Australia
 2016.12 Merge and acquisition of Daewoo Securities and Mirae Asset Securities
 2016.12 Acquired KDB asset management company, formerly owned by Korea Development Bank
 2017.07 Invested Vietnamese life insurance company, PRÉVOIR  
 2017.12 Acquired Korea-based PCA Life Insurance
 2018.07 Acquired GlobalX, US ETF company

Global expansion led by Park 

Founder Park always has in mind to expand the business globally since the early stage, and is regarded as a global forerunner in South Korean financial industry.

 2003.12 Established Mirae Asset Global Investment HK
 2006.09 Established Mirae Asset Global Investment Vietnam (Hanoi)
 2006.11 Established Mirae Asset Global Investment India
 2007.01 Established Mirae Asset Securities HK
 2007.03 Established Mirae Asset Global Investment UK
 2007.07 Established Mirae Asset Global Investment Beijing
 2007.12 Established Mirae Asset Securities Vietnam
 2008.02 Established Mirae Asset Investment Advisory Beijing
 2008.04 Established Mirae Asset Global Investment US
 2008.04 Established Mirae Asset Global Investment Brazil
 2008.08 Established Mirae Asset Securities US
 2008.08 Established Mirae Asset Investment Advisory Shanghai
 2010.08 Established Mirae Asset Securities Brazil
 2012.10 Established Horizons ETFs LatAM
 2016.01 Established Mirae Asset Global Investment Australia
 2017.10 Established Mirae Asset Daewoo India
2019.09 Formed GlobalX Japan joint ventured with Daiwa Securities

Notable global investments led by Park 

Park led to achieving notable global investment activities of noteworthy landmarks in primary cities.

 2011.08 Acquired major shares of Titleist
 2013.09 Acquired Four Seasons Hotel, Sydney
 2014.12 Acquired major shares of FRB building (1801 K St.), Washington DC, US
 2015.05 Acquired major shares of The Fairmont Orchid, Hawaii
 2015.12 Acquired major shares of Fairmont San Francisco
 2016.07 Acquired major shares of Amazon head office, Phase VIII
 2016.09 Acquired major shares of Hyatt Regency Waikiki Beach Resort & Spa

Philanthropy

Mirae Asset Park Hyeon Joo Foundation

Park has been donating all his dividend payouts of shares to the foundation.

Park founded Mirae Asset Education Foundation in 1998 and Mirae Asset Park Hyeon Joo Foundation in 2000 in order to fulfill his corporate social responsibility of 'Building a Caring Capitalist Society,’. He occasionally mentioned that he would like to become a successful philanthropist instead of becoming a successful magnate, and thinks that investing in the talented people is how the corporate is fulfilling the social responsibility in return of what the corporate has gained from the clients and the society as stated in his essay, ‘Money is beautiful flower’.

Mirae Asset Park Hyeon Joo Foundation has continuously provided scholarships and economic education programs to the potential talented youth which has accumulated to 269,476 students for 18 years since the foundation (as of February 2019). The detailed programs are as follows:

 Mirae Asset domestic college scholarships:3,391
 Mirae Asset global exchange student scholarships: 5,117
 Mirae Asset global investment experts undergraduates/graduates scholarships/internship: 
 Mirae Asset Shanghai camp support of children of the clients: 12,700
 Mirae Asset Shanghai camp support of underprivileged students: 1,839
 Mirae Asset other outreaching programs educating on the economy, finance, finance career path, etc.: 246,307

Personal donation 
The scholarship programs of Mirae Asset Park Hyeon Joo Foundation founded in 2000 with his own wealth of USD 6.5 million has become one of the largest non-profit organization in South Korea.

Park has been donating all his dividend payouts to the foundation every year since 2010.

Park once again donated his entire 2018 dividend from the stakes of Mirae Asset Global Investment.

In 2015, Park Hyeon Joo who is deeply interested in job security of young people donated KRW 2 billion from his own wealth to Korea Youth Foundation.

Mirae Asset Foundation in India 
Park has also engaged in establishing Mirae Asset Foundation in Mumbai, India in order to facilitate qualitative educational environments and more opportunities for young people in India. Its incorporation date is January 3, 2018.

Honors and awards 

 2008: the 40th Best South Korean Executive awarded by Korea Management Association
 2009: the Master Entrepreneur by Ernst and Young
 2011: the 1st Best Investment Executive awarded by Korea Financial Investment Association
 2013: the 1st Entrepreneur Award by Maeil Economic Daily
 2015: the 17th Best Enterprise awarded by the Korean Academic Society of Business Administration
 2017: the 26th Best Dasan Award by Korea Economic Daily, Hankyung

Bibliography

Harvard Business School case study 
The successful story of Park and Mirae Asset Financial Group in such a short period of time within a decade was the first Asian financial company to be selected by Harvard Business School as a case study.

Mirae Asset: Korea's Mutual Fund Pioneer

Seoul National University case study - the case centre 
Mirae Asset: A Disruptive Innovator in the Korean Financial Industry

Books about Park 

 Money is a beautiful flower, Park Hyeon Joo, Kim Young Sa, 27 August 2007, 
 Park Hyeon Joo, creating a better future, Chan-Sun Hong, Young-Am Park, Sung-Ju Oh, Sung-Ho Kim and Byung-Yoon Chung, Olim, 5 October 2007,

Park's interviews 

 Long-term investments requires trust, Nomura Research Institute, 12/10/2010
 For asset manager Mirae, a future beyond Korea, The Wall Street Journal, 01/10/2007
 24 years of financial industry, Mirae Asset Park Hyeon Joo, Shin-dong-a, 08/11/2004
 Interview of Park Hyeon Joo, a founder of Mirae Asset Financial Group, Hankyung, 24/12/2015

References

External links 
 Mirae Asset Financial Group
 Mirae Asset Global Investment
 Mirae Asset Daewoo
 Mirae Asset Venture Investment

1958 births
Living people
South Korean business executives
South Korean billionaires
South Korean businesspeople